The Edinburgh International is an annual bonspiel, or curling tournament, that takes place in late November at the Murrayfield Curling Club in Edinburgh, Scotland. The tournament is held in a round robin format.

History
The tournament was started in 1922 as the Worlds Curling Championship, an open competition between Scottish curlers held at the Haymarket Ice Rink. The tournament was renamed the Edinburgh International Curling Championship in 1975 in order for the International Curling Federation to reserve the name "World Curling Championship" for the Air Canada Silver Broom, the men's world curling championship at the time. It became an invitational tournament, inviting the semifinalists of the same year's World Championships, and moved venues to the Murrayfield Curling Rink. A period of decreased interest in the tournament led to the event's relegation from a highly respected international tournament to a domestic circuit tournament. In 2007, the tournament became part of the World Curling Tour and the Curling Champions Tour, the European portion of the World Curling Tour, and was slotted to be held in late November. The event was dropped from the tour after 2016, and currently only consists of a senior men's and senior women's tournament.

Past champions
Only skip's name is displayed before 1952. Team line-up order: skip, third, second, lead.

References

External links
Home Page
Edinburgh Curling Club Home

Former World Curling Tour events
International sports competitions in Edinburgh
Curling competitions in Scotland
Champions Curling Tour events